Sodium- and chloride-dependent creatine transporter 1 is a protein that in humans is encoded by the SLC6A8 gene.

Clinical significance 
Mutations of the SLC6A8 gene can cause cerebral creatine deficiency syndrome 1.

See also
 Sodium:neurotransmitter symporter
 Solute carrier family

References

Further reading

External links
 GeneReviews/NCBI/NIH/UW entry on Creatine Deficiency Syndromes

Solute carrier family